Włochy is a district of Warsaw.

Włochy may also refer to:
Polish name for Italy (see Walhaz for etymology).
Włochy, Kielce County in Świętokrzyskie Voivodeship (south-central Poland)
Włochy, Pińczów County in Świętokrzyskie Voivodeship (south-central Poland)
Włochy, Opole Voivodeship (south-west Poland)